Gal Nevo (born 29 June 1987) is a record-holding Israeli swimmer.

Biography
Gal Nevo was born in Kibbutz Hamadia in the Beit She'an Valley. When the local swimming pool closed, Nevo would practice at Gan HaShlosha National Park.

Sports career
Nevo holds three Israeli records, in the 200m IM, 400m IM and 200m butterfly. He represented Israel at the 2008 and 2012 Summer Olympics.
Nevo competed on behalf of Israel at the 2008 Summer Olympics in Beijing, China. He won a gold medal for Israel in the 2009 Maccabiah Games in the 400 m medley. Nevo also competed on behalf of Israel at the 2012 Summer Olympics in London. Nevo finished 10th in the heats of the 400 meters individual medley, breaking his personal best time.
Nevo also swam at the  2016 Summer Olympics.

See also
Sports in Israel
List of Israeli records in swimming

References

External links
 
 

1987 births
Living people
Israeli male swimmers
Olympic swimmers of Israel
Swimmers at the 2008 Summer Olympics
Swimmers at the 2012 Summer Olympics
Swimmers at the 2016 Summer Olympics
Maccabiah Games medalists in swimming
Maccabiah Games gold medalists for Israel
Israeli Jews
Jewish swimmers
European Aquatics Championships medalists in swimming
Competitors at the 2009 Maccabiah Games
21st-century Israeli people